Güneş Yunus (born 27 July 1942) is a Turkish former sports shooter. He competed at the 1972, 1976 and the 1984 Summer Olympics.

References

1942 births
Living people
Turkish male sport shooters
Olympic shooters of Turkey
Shooters at the 1972 Summer Olympics
Shooters at the 1976 Summer Olympics
Shooters at the 1984 Summer Olympics
Place of birth missing (living people)
20th-century Turkish people